Samme stof som stof is an album by Under byen, released in 2006. The title means "same fabric as fabric", or "same matter as matter", although the word "stof" has multiple meanings in Danish, suggesting a wordplay. "Stof" can mean either fabric, physical matter, or drug, giving the title multiple meanings (such as "same matter as fabric").

Track listing
"Pilot" – 5:10
"Den her sang handler om at få det bedste ud af det" – 7:32
"Tindrer" – 3:27
"Heftig" – 5:18
"Panterplanker" – 0:46
"Af samme stof som stof" – 4:26
"Film og omvendt" – 11:28
"Mere af det samme og meget mere af det hele" – 1:39
"Siamesisk" – 5:45
"Liste over sande venner og forbilleder" – 2:08
"Palads" – 4:10
"Slå sorte hjerte" – 3:13

References 

2006 albums
Under Byen albums
Paper Bag Records albums